Fiza, also known as Fiza: In Search Of Her Brother, is a 2000 Indian Hindi-language crime thriller film written and directed by Khalid Mohammed. It stars Karisma Kapoor as the eponymous lead, along with Hrithik Roshan as her terrorist brother and Jaya Bachchan as their mother.

Upon release, Fiza received positive reviews, with its storyline and soundtrack, as well as cast performances earning praise. A box office hit, the film earned  worldwide. Fiza received seven nominations at the 46th Filmfare Awards and won Best Actress for Kapoor and Best Supporting Actress for Bachchan.

Plot
The film is about a girl, Fiza (Karisma Kapoor), whose brother, Amaan (Hrithik Roshan), disappears during the 1993 Bombay riots. Fiza and her mother Nishatbi (Jaya Bachchan) desperately hold on to the hope that one day he will return. However, in 1999, six years after his disappearance, Fiza, fed up of living with uncertainty, resolves to search of her brother. Driven by her mother's fervent hope and her own determination, Fiza decides to use whatever means she can—the law, media, and even politicians—to find her brother, which brings her into contact with various characters and situations.

When she does find him, to her horror she sees that he has joined a terrorist group. She forces him to come home, and he finally reunites with their mother. However, his allegiance and thoughts make him want to return to the terrorist network, led by Murad Khan (Manoj Bajpayee). A confrontation with two men who harass Fiza leads Amaan to revealing about his involvement with the terrorist network to his sister, mother, and the police. His mother's grief and disappointment eventually lead her to commit suicide.

Fiza tries once more to find her brother, with the help of Aniruddh (Bikram Saluja).

Amaan is sent on a mission to kill two powerful politicians; when he does succeed in assassinating them, his own terrorist group tries to kill him. He escapes, and Fiza follows him. They confront each other, and with the police closing in on him, Amaan asks Fiza to kill him. As a last resort to give him an honourable end, Fiza kills her brother.

Cast 
 Karisma Kapoor as Fiza Ikramullah
 Hrithik Roshan as Amaan Ikramullah
 Jaya Bachchan as Nishatbi Ikramullah
 Shivaji Satam as Mr. Kunal Sawant
 Neha Bajpai as Shehnaz Sulaiman
 Asha Sachdev as Ulfat
 Bikram Saluja as Anirudh Roy
 Isha Koppikar as Gitanjali Malhotra
 Johnny Lever as Laughing Club Comic
 Manoj Bajpai as Murad Khan (cameo appearance)
 Sushmita Sen as Reshma (guest appearance)
 Savita Prabhune as Policewoman (cameo appearance)
 Jaya Bhattacharya as Job interviewer (cameo appearance)

Production
Khalid Mohammed originally wanted to have Ram Gopal Varma direct this movie when he finished the script and had Urmila Matondkar in mind for the central role of Fiza, which was eventually played by Kapoor. Although Kapoor plays Roshan's older sister in this film, he is 5 months older than her in real life. Originally, the role played by Roshan was supposed to be a minor one. But after his debut film Kaho Naa... Pyaar Hai (2000) became a blockbuster overnight, Mohammed panicked. He knew expectations were high because of Roshan, so he increased the length of his role. Many scenes like his workout, and an extra song were added to suit Roshan's new status of a superstar. Additionally, the film was set to be an artistic film. But Mohammed decided to commercialize the film due to pressure from the distributors. A dance number for Kapoor was added, in addition to the park scene with Johnny Lever.

Reception and awards
The film was critically acclaimed and did well at the box office. Critics praised the lead performances. Kapoor in particular was applauded for her performance as a disillusioned sister.

Vinayak Chakravorty from Hindustan Times gave the film 4 out of 5 stars, writing, "Fiza is more than just about Mohammed's foray into film-making. It is about Kapoor proving a point as an actress of some substance. It is about Roshan's establishing that he doesn't need maximum footage or glitz to impress. It is about the return after a hiatus of the ever-delightful Bachchan." Mimmy Jain of The Indian Express, in a positive review, wrote, "Fiza is the kind of movie that every critic prays will never come his way. For a critic's job, after all, is to criticize. And Fiza offers little scope for criticism." She further noted Kapoor for delivering "a superbly flawless performance". Sanjeev Bariana of The Tribune labelled the film "only a little above average", but was highly appreciative of the performances. Suman Tarafdar of Filmfare gave a positive review of the film and Kapoor's acting, and Chaya Unnikrishnan of Screen praised the performances and concluded that Fiza "does live upto the expectations". Screen magazine's critic Chaya Unnikrishnan, while disappointed with the film's second half, described it as "a mature film" and commended the performances. Dinesh Raheja of India Today praised the performances but concluded: "Fiza remains watchable for its captivatingly-captured sequences within a close-knit family. But, the big picture it wants to capture remains underdeveloped."

In May 2010, Fiza was one of the 14 Hindi films selected by the Film Society of Lincoln Center to be screened as part of a section called "Muslim Cultures of Bombay Cinema" which aims to "celebrate and explore the rich influence of Muslim cultural and social traditions on the cinema of Bombay to the present".

Fiza was banned from screening in Malaysia.

Music 

Initially, A. R. Rahman was approached to compose the music for the film, but he declined citing date issues. However he agreed to compose one song which became "Piya Haji Ali", while rest of the songs were composed by Anu Malik. He later composed for the director's next, Tehzeeb (2003). For the background score of Fiza, Rahman suggested his associate Ranjit Barot. Barot composed the score. The album was one of the most popular soundtracks of the year. It features popular songs like "Aaja Mahiya", "Aankh Milaoongi", "Tu Fiza Hai" and "Mehboob Mere". "Mehboob Mere" was performed by Sushmita Sen as an Item number. At the 46th Filmfare Awards, Malik received a Best Music Director nomination for the soundtrack of the film. for his work on this album. According to the Indian trade website Box Office India, with around 25,00,000 units sold, this film's soundtrack album was one of the highest-selling of the year.

Awards and nominations
46th Filmfare Awards:

Won
 Best Actress – Karisma Kapoor
 Best Supporting Actress – Jaya Bachchan
Nominated
 Best Actor – Hrithik Roshan
Best Music Director – Anu Malik
Best Lyricist – Gulzar for "Aaja Mahiya"
 Best Male Playback Singer – Sonu Nigam for "Tu Hawa Hai"
 Best Female Playback Singer – Sunidhi Chauhan for "Mehboob Mere"
 Best Cinematography – Santosh Sivan
2nd IIFA Awards:

Won
 Best Actress – Karisma Kapoor
 Best Supporting Actress – Jaya Bachchan
Nominated

 Best Villain – Manoj Bajpayee
 Best Music Director – A. R. Rahman, Anu Malik & Ranjit Barot
 Best Lyricist – Gulzar for "Tu Fiza Hai"
 Best Male Playback Singer – Udit Narayan for "Aaja Mahiya"
 Best Female Playback Singer – Sunidhi Chauhan for "Mehboob Mere"

2001 BFJA Awards:
 Best Director – Khalid Mohammed
 Best Actor – Hrithik Roshan
 Best Actress – Karisma Kapoor
 Best Supporting Actress – Jaya Bachchan
2001 Sansui Awards:
 Best Actress (Jury) - Karisma Kapoor

See also 

List of highest-grossing Bollywood films

References

External links

2000 films
2000s Hindi-language films
Films set in 1993
Films set in 1999
Films about terrorism in India
Films set in Mumbai
Films about women in India
Films scored by A. R. Rahman
Films scored by Anu Malik
Films scored by Ranjit Barot
Films about fratricide and sororicide
Indian crime thriller films